Ethmia novoryella is a moth in the family Depressariidae. It is found in Madagascar.

References

Moths described in 1976
novoryella